This Day is a Nigerian national newspaper. It is the flagship newspaper of Leaders & Company Ltd and was first published on 22 January 1995. It has its headquarters in Apapa, Lagos State. Founded by Nduka Obaigbena, the chairman and editor-in-chief of the This Day Media Group and Arise News.

As of 2005, it has a circulation of 100,000 copies and an annual turnover of some $35 million (US). It has two printing plants, in Lagos and Abuja. The publishers of the newspaper are the This Day Newspapers Ltd., a company that was noted for its early investment in colour printing, giving the paper an edge among the few durable national newspapers that exist in Nigeria. This Day is a member of the Belt and Road News Network. Since 2014, it has maintained a close relationship with the Chinese embassy.

This Day publisher Nduka Obaigbena has previously been criticised for late and non-payment of the paper's staff and suppliers.

Operations 
The headquarters of THIS DAY is in Lagos. It also has offices and correspondents in the 36 states of Nigeria and other parts of the World.

THIS DAY, named Newspaper of The Year By, was the first Nigerian newspaper to print in colour at a time when most newspapers and the industry were in black and white around the world. It was also one of the first to go digital in Africa.

Attacks and challenges 
In 2001, several THIS DAY editors survived a plane crash at Maiduguri airport in North East Nigeria.

In 2012, THIS DAYs offices in the nation's capital Abuja, and in Kaduna were attacked in suicide car bombings thought to have been carried out by terrorist group Boko Haram.

Founder Nduka Obaigbena spent time in exile in London in 1998, before returning to Nigeria.

This Day awards 
The THIS DAY Awards, in which the newspaper honours leading lights of the society for sectoral performances and lifetime achievements, has become a much sought after event. The Awards have been received by statesmen including former presidents, captains of industry and exceptional individuals in various fields and all walks of life.

See also

 List of Nigerian newspapers

References

External links

1995 establishments in Nigeria
Companies based in Lagos
Daily newspapers published in Nigeria
Newspapers published in Lagos
Publications established in 1995